The Bloke's Guide To Pregnancy is a 2004 book by Jon Smith, a father, Internet marketer. The book provides advice and information to expectant and new fathers. The book outlines what a father can expect to see, think, and feel over the nine months of pregnancy. The book has generated some online debate regarding the role of fathers during pregnancy.

In September 2004, The Bloke's Guide To Pregnancy was the most popular book about fatherhood on Amazon.co.uk.  The book has been translated into Korean.

Synopsis
This book takes a sensible-yet-humorous look at the many stages of pregnancy. It explores the physical and emotional changes that men can expect to see in their partner and in their relationship during pregnancy.

References

2004 non-fiction books
British books
Parenting advice books
Fatherhood
Hay House books